Lalla of Arneae (fl. c80 – c100 AD) was a Graeco-Roman civic benefactor.

Lalla was the daughter of Teimarchos of Arneae in Lycia, Asia Minor, and became the wife of a nobleman named Diotomos. She served as priestess to the Imperial cult, and was responsible for the construction of a public meeting house (parochion) and a gymnasium, jointly with her husband. For these public benefactions the couple were honoured with inscriptions put up by the city of Arneae and by the Lycian League.

References
R. van Bremen, The Limits of Participation (1996)

1st-century Roman women
1st-century Romans
1st-century clergy
Priestesses of the Roman Empire